Alen Kozar (born 7 April 1995) is a Slovenian footballer who plays as a midfielder for Balestier Khalsa.

Career statistics

Club

References

External links
NZS profile 

1995 births
Living people
Slovenian footballers
Association football midfielders
ND Mura 05 players
NK Aluminij players
NŠ Mura players
Balestier Khalsa FC players
Slovenian PrvaLiga players
Slovenian Second League players
Singapore Premier League players
Slovenian expatriate footballers
Expatriate footballers in Singapore